The 1998 UCI Road World Cup was the tenth edition of the UCI Road World Cup, cycling's season-long competition of the ten top-tier one-day classics. It was won by Italian classics specialist Michele Bartoli of the  team. Italian team  won the team competition and placed four riders in the individual top-ten.

Bartoli moved into the lead of the World Cup after his win in Liège–Bastogne–Liège, and claimed a second event win at the Grand Prix de Suisse. He ended the competition with 416 points, more than double the points total of the runner-up, Léon van Bon.

Races

Final standings

Individual results

Team classification

References

External links
Complete results from Cyclingbase.com
 Final classification for individuals and teams from memoire-du-cyclisme.eu

 
 
UCI Road World Cup (men)